Mračaj, which translates as Darkness from Serbo-Croatian, may refer to:

 Mračaj, Bosansko Grahovo, a village in Bosnia and Herzegovina
 Mračaj (Bugojno), a village in Bosnia and Herzegovina
 Mračaj (Gornji Vakuf), a village in Bosnia and Herzegovina
 Mračaj, Žepče, a village in Bosnia and Herzegovina